Kye Thomson (born 5 October 1998) is a speedway rider from Australia.

Speedway career 
In 2018, Thomson finished second in the Australian Under-21 Individual Speedway Championship.

Thomson began his British speedway career riding for the Edinburgh Monarchs in the SGB Championship 2021 and by the end of the season had recorded 209 points. He won both the MSSC Rider of the Year award and the George Wells Memorial Trophy for the most improved young rider. He duly signed for another season for the Monarchs for the SGB Championship 2022 season.

In 2023, he re-signed for the Monarchs for a third successive year and competed in the SGB Premiership 2023.

References 

Living people
1998 births
Australian speedway riders
Edinburgh Monarchs riders